The 2012 Final Resolution was a professional wrestling pay-per-view event produced by Total Nonstop Action Wrestling that was held on December 9, 2012 at the Impact Wrestling Zone in Orlando, Florida. It was the ninth annual Final Resolution event and the final one to be on pay-per-view.

In October 2017, with the launch of the Global Wrestling Network, the event became available to stream on demand.

Storylines

Final Resolution featured eight professional wrestling matches that involved different wrestlers from pre-existing scripted feuds and storylines. Wrestlers portrayed villains, heroes, or less distinguishable characters in the scripted events that built tension and culminated in a wrestling match or series of matches.

The main angle entering Final Resolution involved Bobby Roode going after defending champion Jeff Hardy for the TNA World Heavyweight Championship. At Turning Point, James Storm defeated A.J. Styles and Bobby Roode in a 3-Way match to earn his shot at the TNA World Heavyweight Championship. On the following Impact Wrestling episode during Storm's speech about succeeding through adversity, Roode interrupted and upset his rival, Storm, as part of a manipulative way for Storm to place his title shot on the line in a match between them later that night. As a result, Roode prevailed over Storm using an exposed turnbuckle and a roll-up to snatch the victory and essentially assume Storm's title shot.

Another continuous feud being featured at the event is between A.J. Styles and Christopher Daniels. At Turning Point, Styles suffered a huge loss in a stipulated 3-Way contender's match, where the wrestler pinned would be excommunicated from the TNA World Heavyweight Championship scene until Bound for Glory 2013. On the November 15 edition of Impact Wrestling, with emotions running high, Styles expressed feelings over an upsetting year having to deal with allegations thrown at him as well as coming close to winning the 2012 Bound for Glory Series. Daniels and Kazarian, who had set up and blown such allegations out of proportion to defame and distract Styles, took the chance to mock and insult him calling Styles a "failure". Styles, knowing how many times he fought and beat Daniels, eventually challenged Daniels to one last match to decide who the better man is. Daniels, proud of his momentum with Kazarian throughout the year, later agreed to the match.

The Knockouts match heading into Final Resolution is Mickie James versus TNA Women's Knockout Champion Tara. On the November 15 edition of Impact Wrestling, Mickie James made her return to the company and defeated Gail Kim, ODB, Madison Rayne, and Miss Tessmacher in a No. 1 contender's Battle Royal to gain a shot at the TNA Knockout Championship.

Results

See also 
 2012 in professional wrestling

References

External links
Official Final Resolution site
ImpactWrestling.com

Final Resolution
2012 in professional wrestling in Florida
Professional wrestling shows in Orlando, Florida
December 2012 events in the United States
2012 Total Nonstop Action Wrestling pay-per-view events